Mill Prong House is a historic plantation house located near Red Springs, Hoke County, North Carolina. It was built in 1795 by Scottish immigrant John Gilchrist.

Transfer of Ownership and Modifications 
The home was sold to Archibald McEachern, a fellow Scottish American, in 1834 and was expanded on the back side. The main section is a two-story, three bay, Federal frame dwelling.  It is sheathed in weatherboard and has a gable roof.  It features a center bay, two-tier front porch. It was enlarged in the 1830s and in the fourth quarter of the 19th century.  Also on the property is the contributing McEachern family cemetery.

Historic Recognition and Museum Status 
It was listed on the National Register of Historic Places in 1979. The home now operates as a private museum supported by a non-profit preservation group with monthly open houses.

References

External Links 
Mill Prong Preservation Website

Mill Prong Preservation Facebook Page

Plantation houses in North Carolina
Houses on the National Register of Historic Places in North Carolina
Federal architecture in North Carolina
Houses in Hoke County, North Carolina
National Register of Historic Places in Hoke County, North Carolina

Houses completed in 1795